Lokmat Stylish Awards are Indian awards presented by Lokmat Media Pvt. Ltd. to acknowledge the style statement of leaders in their respective fields including politics, business, sports, lifestyle, and the entertainment industry. The awards were started in 2016 by the media company. Lokmat Stylish Awards 2022 was the sixth edition of the Awards. The award event was organized on September 28, 2022, at JW Marriott in Juhu, Mumbai. The event was hosted by television actor and presenter Manish Paul. Salman Khan was the chief guest.

History 
Lokmat Stylish award’s concept was developed by Rishi Darda, Joint Managing Director & Editorial Director of Lokmat Media Group. These awards were started to honor the style statement of individuals beyond the entertainment industry. The goal of these awards is to acknowledge the talent and creativity of individuals from different sectors. The first edition was attended by then Maharashtra Chief Minister Devendra Fadnavis and politician Aaditya Thackeray.  The first edition of the award was held in 2016. Since then, 6 editions of the awards have been completed. The awards are organized in Mumbai every year.

Winners

References 

Indian awards